David Richardson (born 11 March 1932) was an English professional footballer who played as a full-back.

Richardson joined Aston Villa in 1976 as Youth Development Officer. 

In 1980 Richardson joined Leicester City as Youth Team Manager, unwittingly bringing paedophile, Ted Langford, from his old club to become a scout for Leicester. When both returned to Villa,  Richardson secured schoolboy player Steve Froggatt from Leicester.

References
 

1932 births
Living people
People from Billingham
Footballers from County Durham
English footballers
Association football fullbacks
Leicester City F.C. players
Grimsby Town F.C. players
Swindon Town F.C. players
Barrow A.F.C. players
Oadby Town F.C. players
Kettering Town F.C. players
English Football League players